Forensic tire tread evidence records and analyzes impressions of vehicle tire treads for use in legal proceedings to help prove the identities of persons at a crime scene.  Every tire will show different amounts of tread wear, and different amounts of damage in the form of tiny cuts and nicks. These unique characteristics will also show on the impression left by the tire.

This forensic technique was first invented in 1930 by David Chapman, a researcher affiliated with the Sheriff's Office in Los Angeles, California, in the United States.

References

External links
Scientific Working Group on Shoeprint and Tire Tread Evidence (SWGTREAD), from the International Association for Identification

Tires
Tire tread evidence